The Best of Santana is a 1998 album by Santana and a companion album to 2000's The Best of Santana Vol. 2.  The album peaked at #82 on the Billboard 200, and has sold 1.64 million copies in the U.S. as of May 2009.

Track listing

Certifications

References 

1998 greatest hits albums
Santana (band) compilation albums